WIN-2299 is an anticholinergic drug. Human reactions to WIN-2299 include sedation (2 mg), LSD-like reactions (6 mg), and an acute delirious episode (10 mg).

References

Muscarinic antagonists
Thiophenes
Diethylamino compounds
Cyclopentyl compounds